Usop Sontorian is a Malaysian animated cartoon series aired on TV1 from 1996 to 1997. The country's first animated series, it was created by Ujang and Kamn Ismail (1956–2019) and produced by Kharisma Pictures. Ismail was the managing director of Quest Animations until his death in 2019. Ujang, the creator of the Usop Sontorian characters, was forbidden to draw any cartoon characters similar in likeness to Usop Sontorian, after a failed legal battle to acquire rights to the character. After the series demise and Kharisma Pictures' closure in 1997, many of the production team were switched to different animation companies while others become full-time cartoonist for magazines Ujang and APO?, both under Kharisma Publications (renamed to MOY Publications).

Overview
Usop Sontorian is created by Malaysian cartoonist, Ibrahim Anon or Ujang as he affectionately known, where the concepts, storyline and script all done by him. In an exclusive interview with New Straits Times in December 1993, Ujang describes the anticipated production as a Malaysianised version of The Simpsons, stating that: "It is basically about a Malay family and their culture". Together with series director Kamn Ismail, he took charge of the technical aspects. By March 1993, Ujang teamed up with a group of layout artists and animators to work on the series. Usop Sontorian was made as a comic strip within the Ujang magazine and later as a standalone magazine before its TV series was produced. Malaysian public broadcaster, Radio Televisyen Malaysia (RTM) acquire the broadcast rights of the series with Eurofine handling the distribution.

Synopsis
Usop Sontorian tells the story of the village life of Malaysian boy, Usop and his friends Abu, Dol, Ah Kim, Vellu, and Singh. Usop is the third and youngest child in his family. He has two elder siblings: a sister, Kak Kiah, and a jobless brother named Abang Budin. The story is set in Kampung Parit Sonto, not far from the town of Ayer Hitam, Johor; hence the name "Sontorian". The theme of the series was to promote unity and harmonious relationships between all races in multi-ethnic Malaysia.

Voice cast

Main characters
 Farriz Izwan Khairulanuar as Usop
 Faizal Hairie Khairulanuar as Abu
 Faizal Haredz Mohd Johari as Dol

Supporting characters
 Ruslan Ayob as Singh
 Ameirkhannaz Mohammed as Veloo
 Ahmad Nazri Mahmood as Ah Kim
 Kamn Ismail as Pak Mat (Usop's father)
 Zaharah Jidin as Mak Som (Usop's mother)
 Norwati Ismail as Kak Kiah (Usop's sister)
 Dielfitri Tajudin as Abang Budin (Usop's brother)

Episodes
Although Usop Sontorian started airing in 1996, actually all episodes were produced between 1993 and 1996. During its run, the series spanned 3 seasons and 50 episodes.

Season 1 (1996)

Season 2 (1996–1997)

Season 3 (1997)

Broadcast
Usop Sontorian originally set to be aired in 1994, but it postponed for over 2 years due to uncertain reasons. The series was officially launched by the then-Minister of Information, Datuk Seri Mohamed Rahmat on 20 January 1996 at Putra World Trade Centre (PWTC) and debuted on RTM TV1 from March 4, 1996, and ended on April 14, 1997.

Reruns
In 2009, the series was aired on TV9 from May to December 2009, every Monday to Thursday at 8:30am. Previously, Usop Sontorian aired repeatedly on RTM1 from 2000 to 2002 and RTM2 in April 2005 to January 2006. Some of Usop Sontorian episodes also available on YouTube.

Reception
In 1995, Usop Sontorian received recognition as the "Malaysia's First Animated Series" by The Malaysia Book of Records.

It also well received in Japan when it was screened at the Asian Animation Festival held in Hiroshima, Japan in June 1996. The series was distributed in Malaysia by Eurofine and for international release, it is distributed by Arief International where it retitled as Adventures Of Usop and Usop & Geng. It also dubbed in English and Spanish.

Notes

References

Bibliography
 
 

1996 Malaysian television series debuts
1997 Malaysian television series endings
1990s Malaysian television series
Malaysian children's animated comedy television series
Radio Televisyen Malaysia original programming